Carnegie is a town in Caddo County, Oklahoma, United States. The population was 1,723 at the 2010 census, a 1.7 percent decline from the figure of 1,752 in 2000.

History and culture
Carnegie was named after the famous Scottish American industrialist and philanthropist, Andrew Carnegie. The original name of the town was Latham. The town was originally platted as North and South Latham. North Latham was north of the Washita River, while South Latham was south of the river. North Latham was really intended to be the commercial hub, but was never developed. The Rock Island Railroad was supposed to go along the north side of the river. The railroad was relocated along the south bank of the Washita. So South Latham became the commercial hub. North Latham withered and/or was never developed.

Leaders of the town decided shortly after incorporation in 1903 to rename the town Carnegie in the hopes he would build a library there.  Although the town has a library, Andrew Carnegie never built one there. Of note, there is unofficially a "Carnegie Hall", known more properly as the Carnegie Memorial Auditorium, where community events are held. While currently on hiatus, for several years there was an annual "Stars of Carnegie Hall" talent show showcases individuals across the region and state in a local talent show, in which both local and regional talent are represented.

Carnegie High School has won three state titles in boys basketball (1988,1992,1996), as well as three titles in girls cross country (2002,2003,2004). Carnegie High also has three won state titles in boys cross country.(1999,2000,2020)

The Kiowa Tribe of Oklahoma headquarters are located in Carnegie.

Geography
Carnegie is located at  (35.104334, −98.601166).

Climate

Demographics

As of the census of 2000, there were 1,637 people, 636 households, and 429 families residing in the town. There were 774 housing units at an average density of 694.1 per square mile (266.8/km2). The racial makeup of the town was 64.63% White, 1.22% African American, 23.58% Native American, 8.80% from other races, and 1.77% from two or more races. Hispanic or Latino of any race were 12.28% of the population.

There were 636 households, out of which 31.4% had children under the age of 18 living with them, 48.3% were married couples living together, 15.3% had a female householder with no husband present, and 32.4% were non-families. 30.0% of all households were made up of individuals, and 19.5% had someone living alone who was 65 years of age or older. The average household size was 2.49 and the average family size was 3.10.

In the town, the population was spread out, with 27.4% under the age of 18, 8.0% from 18 to 24, 23.3% from 25 to 44, 20.3% from 45 to 64, and 21.0% who were 65 years of age or older. The median age was 38 years. For every 100 females, there were 88.8 males. For every 100 females age 18 and over, there were 83.8 males.

The median income for a household in the town was $20,987, and the median income for a family was $24,737. Males had a median income of $21,917 versus $14,868 for females. The per capita income for the town was $12,432. About 24.9% of families and 30.5% of the population were below the poverty line, including 42.2% of those under age 18 and 18.6% of those age 65 or over.

Government 
Carnegie is governed by a five-member Town Board of Trustees, as authorized by the Oklahoma Constitution. Members are elected at large from within the town limits for four-year terms. Other public officials include a town clerk and a town treasurer.

The Town of Carnegie operates and maintains a solid waste/sanitation service, and also a water and sewer service, operated through the Carnegie Public Works Authority.

The town has a 19-member volunteer fire department.

The Carnegie Tri-County Municipal Hospital Authority owns a critical-access hospital and clinic facility within the town that provides residents of the area with primary care, radiology, physical therapy, and medical laboratory services. Limited surgical services are also provided. The Carnegie Tri-County Municipal Hospital has three doctors and one nurse practitioner on staff. The hospital is managed and operated by Carnegie Tri-County Hospital Management, Inc.

The Carnegie Library Board, appointed by the Town Board of Trustees, operates a library facility for area residents, providing internet access and a large collection of books, magazines, and audio books.

Economy
Agriculture has been the basis of Carnegie's economy throughout its history. The main production has been cotton, wheat, broomcorn, cattle, hogs and poultry. Oil production replaced agriculture briefly during the 1970s, but declined in economic importance after 1980.

Community 
Carnegie is home to Liberty Theater, the oldest continually operated movie theater in Oklahoma.

Carnegie is host to many community events, including the Carnegie Tri-County Free Fair, the Carnegie Round-Up Club Rodeo, the World Championship Domino Tournament, as well as various other community events throughout the year.

Carnegie also is the home of the Kiowa Tribe of Oklahoma, which has tribal offices located on the west edge of town.

Transportation 

The Town of Carnegie operates and maintains the Carnegie Municipal Airport (Location ID: 86F). There is one asphalt runway, 35/17, 3300 ft long. There are no refueling services available at the airport.

Utilities 
 Carnegie Public Works Authority provides water, sewer, and sanitation services to the town. The Oklahoma Rural Water District #3 also provides water services to outlying areas around Carnegie.
 Electric service is provided by American Electric Power Public Service Company of Oklahoma.
 Natural Gas service is provided by Oklahoma Natural Gas.
 Local telephone service, and fiber-optic internet is provided by Carnegie Telephone Company.
 Digital Cable TV service is provided by Carnegie Cable Company.

Notable people
 Barbara Lawrence (1930–2013), actress, was born in Carnegie.

Notes

References

External links
 Town of Carnegie, Oklahoma website
 Carnegie, OK Chamber of Commerce website
 Encyclopedia of Oklahoma History and Culture – Carnegie

Towns in Caddo County, Oklahoma
Towns in Oklahoma